BFA may refer to:

Art and entertainment
 Bibles for America, an organization distributing free copies of the Bible and Christian books
 British Fantasy Award

Education
 Bachelor of Fine Arts, undergraduate degree for students in the United States and Canada seeking a professional education in the visual or performing arts
 Beijing Film Academy, a coeducational state-run higher education institution in Beijing, China
 Bellows Free Academy, St. Albans, a high school in the USA 
 Black Forest Academy, a private, coeducational boarding school in southwestern Germany

Sport

Football (soccer)
 Bahamas Football Association
 Beirut Football Academy
 Botswana Football Association
 Baltijos Futbolo Akademija

Other sports
 Baseball Federation of Asia
 British Fencing Association
 British Freediving Association

Other uses
 Banana Framework Agreement
 Banco Financiero y de Ahorros, a Spanish financial services company
 Bibles for America, an organization distributing free copies of the Bible and Christian books
 Blank-firing adaptor or blank-firing attachment, a device for using blank ammunition in automatic firearms
 Boao Forum for Asia, an organization hosting forums discussing economic matters in Asia
 Books for Africa, a charity
 Boyne Mountain Airport, serving Boyne Falls, Michigan, United States
 British Florist Association
 British Franchise Association
 Burkina Faso, ISO 3166-1 alpha-3 code
 World of Warcraft: Battle for Azeroth, a video game expansion